The thirty-sixth session of the United Nations General Assembly opened on 15 September 1981. Its last session was held on 20 September 1982. The president was Iraqi politician Ismat T. Kittani.

Resolutions 
 United Nations General Assembly Resolution 36/3
Adopted 25 September 1981 to admit Belize to membership. 144 member nations voted to support, with Guatemala opposing. Democratic Kampuchea, Dominica, Gabon, Gambia, Haiti, Nigeria, Rwanda, Saudi Arabia, South Africa, and Zaire did not vote.
Declaration on the Inadmissibility of Intervention and Interference in the Internal Affairs of States (A/RES/36/103)
Adopted 9 December 1981.

References

External links 
 Resolutions and Decisions adopted by the General Assembly during its 36th session

36
1981 in international relations
1982 in international relations
1981 in the United Nations
1982 in the United Nations